Glenfern is a rural locality in the local government area (LGA) of Derwent Valley in the South-east LGA region of Tasmania. The 2016 census recorded a population of 189 for the state suburb of Glenfern.

History 
Glenfern was gazetted as a locality in 1976. It was previously known as Glen Fern.

Geography
The Plenty River forms the western boundary. A small portion of the northern boundary abuts the Derwent River.

Road infrastructure 
Route C610 (Glenfern Road / Plenty Valley Road) runs through from north-east to north-west.

References

Towns in Tasmania
Localities of Derwent Valley Council